Dieffenbach's rail (Moriori: meriki or mehoriki, Hypotaenidia dieffenbachii) is an extinct flightless species of bird from the family Rallidae. It was endemic to the Chatham Islands. The only recorded living specimen of Dieffenbach's rail was captured in 1840 by Ernst Dieffenbach, who is commemorated in the scientific and common name of the species. It became extinct due to hunting and introduced predators, perhaps soon after 1840.

The Dieffenbach's rail was sympatric with the flightless Chatham rail. Their sympatry suggests parallel evolution after separate colonisation of the Chatham Islands by a common volant ancestor, presumably the buff-banded rail (Hypotaenidia philippensis). A 2014 genetic analysis found that the taxa were not particularly closely related, with Dieffenbach's rail being sister to the group of Hypotaenidia including the Buff-banded rail, while the Chatham rail was found to be in a more basal position.

See also 

 Hawkins's rail another extinct flightless rail endemic to the Chatham Islands.

References

Hypotaenidia
Bird extinctions since 1500
Extinct birds of the Chatham Islands
Birds described in 1843
Taxonomy articles created by Polbot
Birds with names in Moriori